James F. Edwards (May 5, 1910 – December 7, 1991) was an American businessman and philanthropist.

The owner and CEO of the National Mattress Company (Namaco), Edwards married Joan C. Edwards in 1937.

In honor of Mr. and Mrs. Edwards' support of Marshall University, the playing surface of their football stadium was named James F. Edwards Field in 1993. In 2003, the stadium itself was renamed Joan C. Edwards Stadium.

References

Corporate Philanthropy
Edwards Comprehensive Cancer Care

1910 births
1991 deaths
20th-century American businesspeople
Marshall University people
20th-century American philanthropists